Sh2-308, also designated as Sharpless 308, RCW 11, or LBN 1052, and commonly known as the Dolphin-Head Nebula, is an H II region located near the center of the constellation Canis Major, composed of ionised hydrogen. It is about 8 degrees south of Sirius, the brightest star in the night sky. The nebula is bubble-like and surrounds a Wolf–Rayet star named EZ Canis Majoris. This star is in the brief, pre-supernova phase of its stellar evolution.

Central star 

Sh2-308 surrounds the Wolf–Rayet star EZ Canis Majoris, also designated EZ CMa or WR 6. Its apparent magnitude varies from 6.71 to 6.95. Its spectral type indicates that the star is very hot and luminous. The spectrum shows that it is devoid of hydrogen at the surface. EZ Canis Majoris is expected eventually to explode in a supernova, therefore subsuming the nebula.

Formation 
The nebula was formed about 70,000 years ago by the star EZ Canis Majoris throwing off its outer hydrogen layers, revealing inner layers of heavier elements. The hydrogen composing the nebula is ionised by intense ultraviolet radiation. The nebula is approximately 60 light-years across at its widest point.

Observation 
The most favorable period for observing the nebula in the night sky is between the months of December and April. Its southern declination makes it easier to observe from the Southern Hemisphere, though it is easily visible from most of the Northern Hemisphere as well. It appears as a faint cloud in photographs taken with high-power amateur instruments, with the help of special filters.

Gallery

References

External links 

 APOD December 20, 2016

Sharpless objects
Canis Major
Emission nebulae
Nebulae